Annexin A4 is a protein that in humans is encoded by the ANXA4 gene.

Function 

Annexin IV (ANX4) belongs to the annexin family of calcium-dependent phospholipid binding proteins. Although their functions are still not clearly defined, several members of the annexin family have been implicated in membrane-related events along exocytotic and endocytotic pathways.  ANX4 has 45 to 59% identity with other members of its family and shares a similar size and exon-intron organization.  Isolated from human placenta, ANX4 encodes a protein that has possible interactions with ATP, and has in vitro anticoagulant activity and also inhibits phospholipase A2 activity.  ANX4 is almost exclusively expressed in epithelial cells.

References

External links

Further reading